Carl Jacob Reinhold Gardberg (16 November 1926 – 31 May 2010) was a Finnish art historian and archaeologist.

He was born in Helsinki. Having worked with restoration of Turku Castle since 1949, he became an associate professor at Turku Museum in 1954 and took his doctoral degree in 1960. From 1960 to 1972 he was the director of Turku Museum, also working as docent in cultural history at Åbo Academy from 1961 to 1972 and in archaeology at the University of Turku from 1969 to 1972. He then served as director of the Finnish Heritage Agency from 1970 to 1992. He was a member of the Norwegian Academy of Science and Letters from 1987.

References

1926 births
2010 deaths
Swedish-speaking Finns
Finnish art historians
Finnish archaeologists
Academic staff of Åbo Akademi University
Academic staff of the University of Turku
Members of the Norwegian Academy of Science and Letters
Directors of museums in Finland
Directors of government agencies